(also ) is a commentator on Jaimini's Purva Mimamsa Sutras, the , in turn commented upon by Kumarila Bhatta.

He dates to the early centuries CE, later than Patanjali's Mahabhashya, and earlier than Vatsyayana.

References
Bibliography in: Karl H. Potter, Encyclopedia of Indian philosophies: Bibliography, Motilal Banarsidass (1995), p. 184.

External links
 Mimamsa.org
Shabara Bhasya, Translated to English by Ganganath Jha, All 3 Volmunes, Archive.org ebook 

Ancient Indian philosophers